The 53rd district of the Texas House of Representatives contains the entirety of the following counties; Medina, Menard, Pecos, Real, Schleicher, Sutton, and Upton. The current Representative is Andrew Murr, who was first elected in 2014.

References 

53